"Oh No, Not You Again" is a song by English rock band the Rolling Stones, included on their 2005 hit album A Bigger Bang. The song is listed as the tenth track on the album, and was written by Mick Jagger and Keith Richards. Features Mick Jagger on lead, backing vocals and bass, Keith Richards on lead guitar, Ronnie Wood on rhythm guitars, and Watts on drums.

Brief history
"Oh No, Not You Again" is one of the most well-known tracks from A Bigger Bang, the Stones' first new studio album since 1997's Bridges to Babylon. The song was used in media campaigns and tour promotions for the band. It was the first new song from A Bigger Bang played for a public audience in a surprise performance at the Juilliard School in New York City.

Throughout the 2005–2006 A Bigger Bang Tour, which has carried the Stones throughout North America and Europe, "Oh No, Not You Again" has been played continuously and received generally well by fans and critics alike, although critics have noted the similarities in structure to previous Rolling Stones efforts from the early 1970s.

The song got significant rock radio airplay in the US, reaching #34 on Billboards Mainstream Rock Tracks in December 2005.

Charlie Watts jokingly said that the song's title should also be the name of the album, referring to the band's constant return to the studio.

An easter egg on the interactive website for Supernatural, airing on The CW Television Network, mentions this song in a newspaper clipping about a concert, found in the weapons box.

Next single rumors
The tune was erroneously believed to be the next single released from A Bigger Bang in Spring 2006. This rumor was proved false when in April 2006 it was announced that the European summer single would be "Biggest Mistake".

The Rolling Stones songs
2005 songs
Songs written by Jagger–Richards
Song recordings produced by Don Was